Michael Prout is an American Paralympic swimmer.

Biography
Prout graduated with honours from St Marys Senior High School and in 2009 he graduated from University of Massachusetts Amherst. In 2002 he got into first place in all swimming competitions at National Disability Championships which was held at Federal Way, Washington. Next year he got into the first place for 100, 200, and 400 metre freestyle swim which was held at Canadian Open Swim, Edmonton, Alberta, Canada. In 2004 Prout participated in Paralympic Games in Athens, Greece where he won two medals, one of which was gold. In 2005 he won a gold medal for 400m freestyle, which was held at U.S. Paralympics Open Swimming Championships in Minneapolis, Minnesota.

In 2006 he got fourth place three times in a row at the 2006 IPC Swimming World Championships, but next year, won eight medals at Parapan American Games. In 2007 Prout won four gold for 100 m backstroke, the same for freestyle, 200 m individual medley and 400 metre freestyle. The same year he also won three silver medals for 50 metre freestyle, 100 m butterfly, and 400 metre freestyle relay. The same year he won a bronze medal for 400 m medley relay at Parapan American Games, at Rio de Janeiro, Brazil. In 2008 he led an American record for 200 metre freestyle at Can-Am Championships which was held at Victoria, British Columbia. Three years later he won another gold medal for 100 metre backstroke, a silver one, for 400 metre and bronze for 200 metre individual medley. 

He worked for Colorado Springs Olympic Training Center where in 2012 he met with former US President Barack Obama. He now coaches the Simmons University Swim and Dive team and is loved by all.

Michael Prout is a son of Michael and Patricia Prout and have a sister named Taryn.

References

1986 births
Living people
Sportspeople from Springfield, Massachusetts
University of Massachusetts Amherst alumni
Paralympic swimmers of the United States
Paralympic bronze medalists for the United States
Paralympic gold medalists for the United States
Swimmers at the 2004 Summer Paralympics
American male backstroke swimmers
American male butterfly swimmers
American male freestyle swimmers
American male medley swimmers
Medalists at the 2004 Summer Paralympics
Swimmers at the 2008 Summer Paralympics
Swimmers at the 2012 Summer Paralympics
Paralympic medalists in swimming
Medalists at the 2007 Parapan American Games
Medalists at the World Para Swimming Championships
S9-classified Paralympic swimmers
21st-century American people